Ray McCauley (born 1 October 1949 as Raynor McCauley) is a prominent South African religious leader, former Senior Pastor of Rhema Bible Church, President of the International Federation of Christian Churches (IFCC), co-chair of the National Interfaith Council of South Africa (NICSA), author and former champion bodybuilder.

Early life
McCauley was born in Johannesburg on 1 October 1949. He took a keen interest in bodybuilding, is a Mr South Africa and took part in the Mr Universe bodybuilding championships in London in 1974 where he finished in third place. He was also a nightclub bouncer for a time.

Ministry
McCauley attended bible college with his first wife Lyndie at Rhema Bible Training Center in Tulsa, Oklahoma during 1978/9. On their return to South Africa the McCauleys started Rhema Bible Church under Rhema Ministries SA in the home of his parents, Jimmy and Doreen, which 13 people attended. Membership grew and the church moved into the former Constantia Cinema in Rosebank, Johannesburg. Under the leadership of Ray and Lyndie McCauley, the church outgrew its premises and moved to a warehouse in Jan Smuts Avenue in Randburg before moving to its current premises. In 1985 the church moved into the newly constructed 5,000 seater auditorium in Randburg, Johannesburg. The new church was dedicated on 16 June 1985 by Dr Kenneth E Hagin, the late founder of Rhema Ministries in Tulsa, Oklahoma. The auditorium was later upgraded to more than 7,500 seats to accommodate the growth of the church. Today the church has a 45,000 strong congregation, which is the single largest church congregation in southern Africa.

Towards the end of the apartheid era, McCauley and his associates were involved in numerous critical events that helped with the peaceful transition to a democratic nation in 1994. During this time he interacted with leading churchmen like Archbishop Emeritus Desmond Tutu and Reverend Frank Chikane.

McCauley is a well-known speaker at church events around the world.

Controversy
McCauley has been a controversial figure in South Africa.

Rhema Ministries has been accused of being a proponent of the prosperity gospel.

McCauley has led a controversial lifestyle, with many alleging that he leads a millionaire's lifestyle. McCauley has defended himself on numerous occasions with the argument that he only earns the salary of a chief executive of a medium-sized company.

The location and construction of the church at the corner of Rabie and Hans Schoeman streets in Randpark Ridge also caused controversy with vehement objections from local residents.

McCauley's greatest controversy came with the divorce from his first wife Lyndie in 2000. According to the ministry, Lyndie McCauley instituted divorce proceedings for which the ministry believed she had no biblical grounds. The divorce caused a large portion of the then congregation to depart from the church. Shortly after the divorce, McCauley became romantically involved with a two-time divorcee, Zelda Ireland, whom he married in July 2001. In January 2010, Rhema Bible Church announced that McCauley and Ireland had separated and that divorce proceedings had been instituted by Ireland. After being divorced for over 2 years, McCauley and Ireland remarried in November, 2013 at a ceremony described as "very modest and low-key" in Muldersdrift outside Johannesburg.

In 2009 McCauley caused waves politically when he invited the then unelected President of South Africa, Jacob Zuma, to speak at a Sunday morning meeting. This led to accusations of political bias. When Zuma took office in 2009, McCauley formed a new interfaith organization called the National Interfaith Leadership Council (NILC) which subsequently merged with the National Religious Leaders Forum (NRLF) to form the National Interfaith Council of South Africa (NICSA) in 2011. McCauley and the interfaith organizations he represents have publicly defended Zuma and the ANC government on several highly controversial matters.

McCauley has also been a strong opponent of gay rights.

Books and television
McCauley has authored several books including Our God Is An Awesome God (1993), Walk In Faith (1998), Making Your World Different (2000), The Secret Place (2003), Expect More (2005), Bottom Line (2005), Choose This Day (2007), Live Long, Die Young (2008), Power & Passion, Holy Ghost Fire and Purpose Powered People. His biography, Destined To Win (1986), was written by Ron Steele.

Rhema Television (RTV) broadcasts A New Day with Pastor Ray featuring teachings by McCauley.

References

External links 
 Rhema Bible Church
 International Federation of Christian Churches

Living people
1949 births
South African Christian religious leaders
South African religious leaders